Expektoration is a 2010 live album by British-American rapper/producer MF Doom, featuring Big Benn Klingon. Recorded in New York, this performance was originally released as a DVD packaged with the 2007 expanded edition of Mm..Food.

Critical reception
At Metacritic, which assigns a weighted average score out of 100 to reviews from mainstream critics, the album received an average score of 61% based on 7 reviews, indicating "generally favorable reviews".

Track listing

References

External links
 

2010 live albums
MF Doom albums
Live hip hop albums